This is a list of Scottish Cup winning football managers. The Scottish Cup was first competed for in the 1873–74 season. Football in Scotland did not become a professional sport until the 1890s. This meant that clubs in this early period were generally organised by a management committee, or a board of directors if the club had been incorporated. The position of team manager was not introduced in Scottish football until the 1890s, or even later in some instances.

Willie Maley, with Celtic in 1899, was the first team manager to win the competition. This list gives details of the winning club and their manager in each season since then. Maley is also the most successful manager in the history of the competition, winning 14 Scottish Cups during his long tenure.

Winning managers

By individual

By nationality

See also
List of Scottish Cup finals (a full list of Scottish Cup winning clubs)
List of FA Cup winning managers (English equivalent)

Notes

References

Managers
Scottish Cup
Cup winning managers